Vilanova del Camí is a municipality in the comarca of the Anoia in Catalonia, 
Spain. The name literally means "New Town of the Route", the route being the road from Igualada to 
Vilafranca del Penedès (now the C-244). It is situated in the centre of the Òdena Basin immediately to the south-east 
of Igualada. The town is served by a station on the FGC  railway line R6 from Barcelona and Martorell to Igualada. There are several sizable industrial parks, serving the entire area.

Twin towns
 Calcinaia, Italy
 Amilly, France

References

 Panareda Clopés, Josep Maria; Rios Calvet, Jaume; Rabella Vives, Josep Maria (1989). Guia de Catalunya, Barcelona: Caixa de Catalunya.  (Spanish).  (Catalan).

External links 
Official website 
 Government data pages 

Municipalities in Anoia